Norvegia (Latin for "Norway") is a Norwegian cow's milk cheese produced by Tine. It has a market share of about 60% of white cheeses in Norway. It is similar to Gouda, has a mild taste and melts easily. There are different types of it. It has been produced since the 1890s. Its recipe details remain a trade secret of Tine.

See also
 Jarlsberg cheese
 List of cheeses

References 

Norwegian brands